The Green Shutter Hotel is a historic hotel building located in downtown Hayward in Alameda County, California, United States. The building was listed on the National Register of Historic Places in 2004, and is on the California Register of Historical Resources.

History
The building was constructed in 1920 and was first used as a hotel after a large addition in 1926. It is currently used commercially, and houses the Green Shutter Hotel (a single room occupancy) on the second floor, with retail businesses on the ground floor, including The Bistro, a pub and music venue, and The Book Shop, now closed, an independent bookstore and at the time the only bookstore in Hayward.

In 2017, the interior of the second floor of the building was largely gutted, shutting down the residential hotel. Some ground floor businesses are still operating. The building is intended to reopen as apartments.

See also

National Register of Historic Places listings in Alameda County, California
List of hotels in California

References

External links
Green Shutter Hotel at the National Register of Historic Places website
historic photo at Hayward Area Historical Society website

Buildings and structures in Hayward, California
Bookstores in the San Francisco Bay Area
Hotels in the San Francisco Bay Area
Hotel buildings completed in 1926
Hotel buildings on the National Register of Historic Places in California
National Register of Historic Places in Alameda County, California
Residential buildings in Alameda County, California